Ali Dere (born 29 September 1992) is a Turkish professional footballer who plays as a winger for Altınordu.

International career
He is also a youth international, earning caps at U-18, U-19 and U-21 level for Turkey.

He was selected for the national team for the 2011 UEFA European Under-19 Championship in which he played three games and scored a goal.

References

External links
 

1992 births
People from Bolvadin
Living people
Turkish footballers
Turkey youth international footballers
Turkey under-21 international footballers
Konyaspor footballers
Fethiyespor footballers
Boluspor footballers
1922 Konyaspor footballers
İstanbulspor footballers
Altınordu F.K. players
Süper Lig players
TFF First League players
TFF Second League players